Soviet Philatelic Association (SFA) was a business run by the Soviet Union authorities in the field of philately.

History 
Two early philatelic public entities existed in the Soviet Union. These were All-Russian Society of Philatelists (created in 1922) and Philatelic International (or Filintern organised in 1924). In July 1924, an "All-Union Philatelic Association of Socialist Soviet Republics" was formed. It was called the "State Philatelic Organization". This association was entrusted to Feodor Chuchin. He also supervised another state body, Organisation of the Commissioner for Philately and Scripophily. The All-Union Philatelic Association ceased to exist soon after. It lacked a published decree of the All-Russian Central Executive Committee (VTsIK) and RSFSR Sovnarkom.

On 25 October 1926, a new association was established in Moscow by VTsIK and Sovnarkom decree. It replaced the Organisation of the Commissioner for Philately and Scripophily. SFA sold Soviet stamps to foreign dealers, Soviet philatelists, and schoolboys. These latter glued their stamps into school notebooks because of a lack of stamp albums.

The SFA organ was the journal Sovetskii Filatelist (Soviet Philatelist).

In 1938, the Soviet Philatelic Association was replaced with the Chief Philatelic Bureau.

See also

References

Further reading 
  Archived from the original and another source on 2015-05-15.

External links 
 

Philately of the Soviet Union
Government agencies of Russia
1926 establishments in the Soviet Union
Philatelic organizations
Defunct organizations based in Russia
Organizations established in 1926
Organizations disestablished in 1938